William Rufus Day (April 17, 1849 – July 9, 1923) was an American diplomat and jurist who served as an associate justice of the Supreme Court of the United States from 1903 to 1922. Prior to his service on the Supreme Court, Day served as United States Secretary of State during the administration of President William McKinley. He also served as a United States circuit judge of the United States Court of Appeals for the Sixth Circuit and the United States Circuit Courts for the Sixth Circuit.

Education and career
Day was born in Ravenna, Ohio, one of the children of Emily (Spaulding) Day and Judge Luther Day of the Ohio Supreme Court. He graduated with a Bachelor of Science degree from the University of Michigan in 1870, spent a year studying law with attorney and judge George F. Robinson, and then a year at the University of Michigan Law School. He was admitted to the bar in 1872 and settled in Canton, Ohio, where he began practicing law in partnership with William A. Lynch. For twenty-five years, Day worked as a criminal defense and corporate lawyer in the growing industrial town while participating in Republican politics.

During these years, Day became a good friend of William McKinley. Day became McKinley's legal and political adviser during McKinley's candidacies for the Congress, the Governorship of Ohio, and the Presidency of the United States. After he won the Presidency, McKinley appointed Day to be Assistant Secretary of State under Secretary of State John Sherman. Sherman was considered to be ineffective because of declining health and failing memory, and in 1898, President McKinley replaced Sherman with Day.

Five months later, Day vacated his cabinet position to helm the United States Peace Commission formed to negotiate an end to the Spanish–American War with Spain. After the Spanish–American War was declared, Day had argued that the Spanish colonies, other than Cuba, should be returned to Spain, contrary to McKinley's decision that the United States should take over from Spain control of the Philippines, Puerto Rico, and Guam.  Day, however, negotiated peace with Spain on McKinley's harsher terms. Day was worried the terms McKinley was insisting on would be "humiliating" to Spain, and for that reason Spain would not agree to them. Ultimately Spain did submit to McKinley's "painfully harsh" terms. His final diplomatic effort was to lead the United States Peace Commission to Paris and sign the treaty ending the war. He was succeeded at the Department of State by John Hay.

Court of Appeals and Circuit Courts service
Day received a recess appointment from President Benjamin Harrison to the United States District Court for the Northern District of Ohio on May 24, 1889, but declined the appointment.

He was confirmed by the United States Senate on February 28, 1899, and received his commission the same day. His service terminated on February 23, 1903, due to his elevation to the United States Supreme Court.

Supreme Court service
On February 19, 1903, Day was nominated by President Theodore Roosevelt as an associate justice of the Supreme Court, to succeed George Shiras Jr. Roosevelt had initially offered the position to William Howard Taft, who declined in order to remain in his post as governor of the Philippines. The United States Senate confirmed the nomination on February 23, 1903, and Day took the judicial oath of office on March 2, 1903. He served as Circuit Justice for the Seventh Circuit from March 9, 1903, to March 17, 1912, and as Circuit Justice for the Sixth Circuit from March 18, 1912, to November 13, 1922.

Notable cases
Day wrote 439 opinions during his tenure on the court, of which only 18 were dissents. He distrusted large corporations and voted with antitrust majorities throughout his time on the court. He sided with the government in the Standard Oil, American Tobacco, and Union Pacific cases in 1911 and 1912 and again in the Southern Pacific case in 1922.

Day delivered the opinion of the Court in Weeks v. United States, where the highest Court ruled that the warrantless seizure of documents from a private home violated the Fourth Amendment prohibition against unreasonable searches and seizures, and evidence obtained in this manner is excluded from use in federal criminal prosecutions.

Baseball
Day was an avid baseball fan. He is recorded as asking his clerk for "regular updates" during the bench hearing of Standard Sanitary Mfg. Co. v. United States about the final game of the 1912 World Series.

Retirement and death
Day retired from the court on November 13, 1922, and briefly served as an Umpire of the Mixed Claims Commission to Adjudicate War Claims against Germany. He died on July 9, 1923, on Mackinac Island in Michigan, aged 74. He was interred at West Lawn Cemetery in Canton.

Family

In 1875, Day married Mary Elizabeth Schaefer.  They were married until her death in 1912, and were the parents of four sons: William, Rufus, Stephen, and Luther. His sons were appellate lawyers who litigated cases before the Supreme Court.

Selected opinions authored by Day
Ware & Leland v. Mobile County, 209 U.S. 405 (1908) – held that contracts for the sales of cotton for future delivery that do not oblige interstate shipments are not subjects of interstate commerce
Bobbs-Merrill Co. v. Straus, 210 U.S. 339 (1908) – helped establish "first-sale doctrine" in United States copyright law
Muskrat v. United States, 219 U.S. 346 (1911) – held that there must be an actual controversy between parties for the Federal courts to have jurisdiction
Flint v. Stone Tracy Co., 220 U.S. 107 (1911) – held privilege of operating in corporate form justifies imposition of an income tax
Bauer & Cie. v. O'Donnell, 229 U.S. 1 (1913) – held that patent rights could not be extended by the holder by means of a licensing agreement
Weeks v. United States, 232 U.S. 383 (1914) – held that exclusionary rule is applicable to the federal government for violations of the Fourth Amendment
Buchanan v. Warley, 245 U.S. 60 (1917) – held that municipal ordinances segregating neighborhoods were unconstitutional
Hammer v. Dagenhart, 247 U.S. 251 (1918) – held that laws regulating child labor are beyond the scope of Congress's constitutional power under the commerce clause
Hawke v. Smith, 253 U.S. 221 (1920) – held that a state referendum could not rescind its legislative ratification of a federal constitutional amendment after that amendment had passed.

See also
List of justices of the Supreme Court of the United States

References

Sources
 
 McLean, Joseph E. William Rufus Day: Supreme Court Justice from Ohio. The Johns Hopkins University Studies in Historical and Political Science 64. Baltimore, MD: Johns Hopkins Press, 1946.

External links

 
 William R. Day at The Political Graveyard
 William R. Day biography at The Ohio Judicial Court
 William R. Day biography at Michael Ariens
 William R. Day biography at The United States Court of Appeals for the Sixth Circuit
 William R. Day biography at The Raven Hall of Fame
 William R. Day biography at The United States State Department
 William R. Day biography at The Hall of the Secretaries of State 

|-

1849 births
1923 deaths
19th-century American judges
19th-century American politicians
20th-century American judges
American Lutherans
Burials at West Lawn Cemetery
Judges of the United States Court of Appeals for the Sixth Circuit
McKinley administration cabinet members
Ohio lawyers
Ohio Republicans
People from Ravenna, Ohio
People of the Spanish–American War
Lawyers from Canton, Ohio
United States Assistant Secretaries of State
United States federal judges appointed by Theodore Roosevelt
United States federal judges appointed by William McKinley
United States Secretaries of State
Justices of the Supreme Court of the United States
University of Michigan Law School alumni